Nao Hibino was the defending champion, but chose to participate in Nürnberg instead.

Kyōka Okamura won the title, defeating Nigina Abduraimova in the final, 7–6(12–10), 1–6, 7–5.

Seeds

Main draw

Finals

Top half

Bottom half

References 
 Main draw

Kurume Best Amenity Cup - Singles
Kurume Best Amenity Cup